Charlotte County is a U.S. county located in southwestern Florida. As of the 2020 census, the population was 186,847. Its county seat is Punta Gorda.

Charlotte County comprises the Punta Gorda, FL Metropolitan Statistical Area, which is included in the North Port-Sarasota, FL Combined Statistical Area.

History
Charlotte County was established April 23, 1921. It was named for the Bay of Charlotte Harbor. "Charlotte" came from "Carlota" (Spanish). In 1565, the Spanish named "Bahia de Carlota," followed by the English in 1775 who named the area Charlotte Harbor in tribute to the Queen Charlotte Sophia, wife of King George III. Punta Gorda is the only incorporated city in Charlotte County.

On August 13, 2004 Charlotte County, Hurricane Charley came ashore near Port Charlotte as a Category 4 hurricane. On September 28, 2022, Charlotte County was struck by Hurricane Ian, which made a second landfall near the city of Punta Gorda, Florida.

Historic places
Historic places in Charlotte County include the Old Charlotte County Courthouse as well as those on the List of Registered Historic Places in Charlotte County.

Geography
Charlotte Harbor Estuary is an important natural preserve and one of the most productive in Florida.

Adjacent counties
 Sarasota County - northwest
 DeSoto County - north
 Highlands County - northeast
 Glades County - east
 Hendry County - southeast
 Lee County - south

National protected area
 Island Bay National Wildlife Refuge

Demographics

As of the 2020 United States census, there were 186,847 people, 79,789 households, and 51,016 families residing in the county.

As of the census of 2010, there were 159,978 people, 73,370 households, and 44,130 families residing in the county. The population density was 234 people per square mile (79/km2). There were 100,632 housing units at an average density of 115 per square mile (44/km2). The racial makeup of the county was 90.05% White, 5.68% Black or African American, 0.26% Native American, 1.19% Asian, 0.04% Pacific Islander, 1.10% from other races, and 1.67% from two or more races. 5.76% of the population were Hispanic or Latino of any race. 92.3% spoke only English at home. 3.0% of the population spoke Spanish at home and 1.1% French.

There were 73,370 households, out of which 17.66% had children under the age of 18 living with them, 59.20% were married couples living together, 7.20% had a female householder with no husband present, and 30.90% were non-families. 26.00% of all households were made up of individuals, and 16.70% had someone living alone who was 65 years of age or older. The average household size was 2.18 and the average family size was 2.56.

In the county, the population was spread out, with 14.30% under the age of 18, 5.38% from 18 to 24, 6.99% from 25 to 34, 39.21% from 35 to 64, and 34.12% who were 65 years of age or older (making this the county with the highest percentage of people over 65 in America). The median age was 56.43 years. For every 100 females there were 94.58 males.

The median income for a household (2007-2011) in the county was $45,112; median income for families (2007-2011) was $47,415. Males (2011) had a median income of $27,352 versus $26,861 for females. The per capita income for the county was $28,875. About 5.30% of families and 11.9% of the population were below the poverty line, including 17.40% of those under age 18 and 5.60% of those age 65 or over.

According to an October 2001 Census Brief of the 2000 Census, Charlotte County had the highest median age of any U.S. county with a population of more than 100,000 people at 54.3.
The median age in 2010 for Charlotte County was 55.9 years, second only to Sumter County in Florida.

Government and politics

The county is governed by a five-person Commission, all of them elected to represent districts within the county for a four-year term. The elections are partisan according to political party affiliation and primaries are held months earlier in the event there are numerous candidates. All registered voters in the county are allowed to vote for a candidate Commissioner in each the five districts, not just the voters living in a particular district.

The five current Commissioners for Charlotte County, Florida and terms of office expirations:
 Ken Doherty (R), District 1, November 3, 2020
 Christopher Constance (R), District 2, November 8, 2022
 Bill Truex (R) District 3, November 3, 2020
 Stephen R. Deutsch (R) District 4, November 8, 2022
 Joe Tiseo (R) District 5, November 3, 2020

Charlotte County, as is typical for the southwestern Florida coast, became and remained a solidly Republican county in the years following the Second World War. No Democrat has won the county since Lyndon Johnson did so during his 1964 landslide, with only Bill Clinton in 1992 and 1996 not being outvoted by an absolute majority due to the appeal of Ross Perot. Charlotte resisted George Wallace in the 1968 election to still return an absolute Republican majority, unlike several neighboring counties.

Voter Registration

Economy

Education
Florida SouthWestern State College maintains a campus in the county. Southern Technical College operates a campus in the county. Charlotte County Public Schools administers all public schools from kindergarten through twelfth grade.

Western Michigan University operated a regional location in the county until August 2019 when they closed the school. AeroGuard Flight Training Center opened a flight school at the airport. The Airframe and Power Plant Program offered through Charlotte Technical College will most likely be ready to open at the airport beginning January 2021.

Library
The Charlotte County Library System consists of 4 library branches.
 Port Charlotte Public Library
 Punta Gorda Public Library
 Englewood Charlotte Public Library
 Mid-County Regional Library

The erection of the first library was in 1963.  In 1976, Charlotte County and Glades County joined to make the Charlotte-Glades Library System.  One reason the counties paired together was due to the additional $50,000 in state aid to libraries who join together to serve the public.  Charlotte County was financially responsible in the relationship. In 2008 the two counties separated and reverted to providing services to residents and visitors of their own communities. The newest addition to the library system was an expansion to the Englewood Branch; the new building created is an additional 6,500 square feet.  This provides more space for the youth services department, a new computer lab, and an archives run by the historical department.

Communities

City
 Punta Gorda

Census-designated places (unincorporated)

 Charlotte Harbor
 Charlotte Park
 Cleveland
 Englewood
 Grove City
 Harbour Heights
 Manasota Key
 Port Charlotte
 Rotonda
 Solana

Other unincorporated communities

 Boca Grande
 Cape Haze
 Deep Creek
 Little Gasparilla Island
 Murdock
 Placida
 Babcock Ranch, a solar-powered community currently under construction.

Transportation

Airport
 Punta Gorda Airport (Florida)

See also
 National Register of Historic Places listings in Charlotte County, Florida
 Southwest Florida

Notes

References

External links
 
 Charlotte County Government / Board of County Commissioners Main Portal
 Charlotte County Chamber of Commerce

 
Charter counties in Florida
1921 establishments in Florida
Populated places established in 1921